Assisted suicide is the ending of one's own life with the assistance of another. Physician-assisted suicide is medical assistance in helping another person end their own life for the purpose of relieving their suffering, and voluntary euthanasia is the act of ending the life of another, also for the purpose of relieving their suffering. The phrase "assisted dying" is often used instead of physician-assisted suicide by proponents of legalisation and the media when used in the context of a medically assisted suicide for the purpose of relieving suffering. "Assisted dying" is also the phrase used by politicians when bills are proposed in parliament. Assisted suicide is illegal under English law.

England and Wales
Section 2 of the Suicide Act 1961, as originally enacted, provided that it was an offence to "aid, abet, counsel or procure the suicide of another" and that a person who committed this offence was liable to imprisonment for a term not exceeding fourteen years. That section has been amended by the Coroners and Justice Act 2009.

Approximately 46 Britons a year go abroad to Dignitas in Switzerland for a physician-assisted suicide. No family member has been convicted of helping them although some have been charged and have had to wait before hearing the charges have been dropped. Because of the inconsistencies between the law and prosecution Debbie Purdy launched a case to clarify whether or not her husband would risk being prosecuted if he helped her travel to a Dignitas clinic in Switzerland to die. Purdy's case ended on 30 August 2009 with the decision that the Director of Public Prosecutions had to clarify how the Suicide Act 1961 is to be enforced in England and Wales. The DPP issued guidelines in February 2010 setting out situations where a prosecution was not in the public interest, and therefore unlikely to happen. Two factors which point towards a prosecution not being in the public interest are that the victim had reached a voluntary, clear, settled and informed decision to commit suicide; and that the suspect was wholly motivated by compassion.

Attempts at reform
There have been various attempts to introduce legislation to change the legal situation regarding physician-assisted suicide in the United Kingdom.

In 1931 Dr C. Killick Millard, the President of the Society of Medical Officers of Health, proposed a Voluntary Euthanasia (Legislation) Bill for incurable invalids. In 1935, Lord Moynihan and  Dr Killick Millard founded the British Voluntary Euthanasia Society (later known as EXIT and now as Dignity in Dying). The first attempt to reform the law in England was in 1936 by Lord Arthur Ponsonby and supported by the Euthanasia Society.

The British Voluntary Euthanasia Society produced A Guide To Self Deliverance  giving guidelines on how a person should commit suicide. Publication was delayed amid controversy because of the Suicide Act of 1961 which states that the legal system can allow up to 14 years in prison for anyone that assists in a suicide. Therefore, it was unclear whether the Society could be held accountable for assisting in suicide because of its publication.

In 1969, a Bill was introduced into the House of Lords by Lord Raglan. In 1970, the House of Commons debated the issue. Baroness Wootton introduced a Bill to the Lords in 1976 on the matter of "passive euthanasia".

On 10 December 1997, a vote was taken in the House of Commons on the issue of introducing a Doctor Assisted Dying Bill, proposed by Labour MP Joe Ashton. The bill was defeated by 234 votes to 89.

Between 2003 and 2006, Labour peer Lord Joffe made four attempts to introduce bills that would have legalized physician-assisted suicide and voluntary euthanasia - all were rejected by Parliament.

In June 2012, the British Medical Journal published an editorial arguing that medical organisations like the British Medical Association ought to drop their opposition to assisted dying and take a neutral stance so as to enable Parliament to debate the issue and not have what Raymond Tallis described as a "disproportionate influence on the decision".

In 2014, Labour peer Lord Falconer introduced an Assisted Dying Bill into the House of Lords. The bill proposed that terminally ill patients with a life expectancy of less than six months be given the option of a medically assisted death, subject to legal safeguards. The bill reached committee stage before running out of time in the session.

In 2015, Labour MP Rob Marris introduced an Assisted Dying Bill based on Lord Falconer's proposals the year before. The bill was defeated by 118 votes to 330 on 11 September 2015.

In 2016, Conservative peer Lord Hayward reintroduced the Assisted Dying Bill into the Lords. The bill did not get past the first reading due to the parliamentary session ending.

On 28 January 2020, Lord Falconer again introduced an Assisted Dying Bill into the House of Lords. the bill is similar to the 2014 iteration. The bill is currently awaiting second reading in the House of Lords.

On 28 September 2020, the British Medical Association restated its position on assisted dying, asserting that the BMA believes no form of assisted suicide should be made legal within the UK. One year later in September 2021, the BMA have formally adopted “a neutral position” on physician assisted dying.

On 26 May 2021, Baroness Meacher introduced an Assisted Dying Bill into the House of Lords. The bill is similar to previously read iterations, and is currently awaiting second reading in the House of Lords. Humanists UK welcomed the bill but also criticised it for not addressing the needs of the intolerably suffering who are not terminally ill.

Scotland

Assisted dying in Scots law might constitute murder, culpable homicide or no offence depending on the nature of the assistance. In 1980, the Scottish branch of the British Voluntary Euthanasia Society (now called Exit) broke off from its original society in order to publish How to Die with Dignity, which became the first publication of its kind in the world.

In a 2012 consultation on the Member's Bill proposed by MSP Margo MacDonald, 64% of the members of the public who choose to give comment on the issue rejected the proposals. A similar consultation by the Health and Sport Committee in 2014 came to a different conclusion, with 78% of responses by individuals being supportive of the proposals. Nevertheless, in 2015 a majority of MSPs including the first minister Alex Salmond voted against the bill in the Scottish Parliament, defeating it in its first stage.

In February 2019 a group of MSPs, including previous opponent Kezia Dugdale, formed to attempt to reform assisted dying law in the Scottish Parliament.

Northern Ireland 

Since health is a devolved matter in the United Kingdom, it would be for the Northern Ireland Assembly to legislate for assisted dying as and when it sees fit. To date, no such bills have been tabled there.

Crown dependencies and overseas territories

Jersey

In October 2018, in response to a petition, Jersey's Health Minister called on the laws banning assisted dying to be reviewed.

In November 2021, Jersey politicians voted by 36 to 10 in favour of legalising assisted dying in principle. A further debate will be scheduled for 2022 into implementation processes and safeguards.

Guernsey

In May 2018, a vote was taken on the issue in Guernsey. The proposals would have allowed those with six months or less to live access to assisted dying. The vote was lost.

Falkland Islands

In July 2018 the Falkland Islands voted, in principle, to allow assisted dying for the terminally ill, subject to safeguards. They are the first British overseas territory to do so. In addition they voted to consider changing the law on assisted dying if the UK did the same. Whilst the vote did not change the law, campaigners saw it as a vote of support for legalisation in the UK.

Legal challenges

There have been multiple challenges to the blanket ban on assisted suicide by people wanting a physician-assisted suicide, both by patients with and without a terminal illness.

In 2001, motor neurone disease sufferer Diane Pretty took her case to the House of Lords, for the right to allow her husband to assist legally in her suicide. The case was dismissed by them, and also subsequently by the European Court of Human Rights in 2002.

In 2008, multiple sclerosis sufferer Debbie Purdy took her case to the House of Lords for clarification on whether her husband would face prosecution on returning from Switzerland, should he help her to travel there for an assisted death. She won, and the Director of Public Prosecutions clarified the likelihood of prosecution in this instance in 2009.

In 2012 a man with locked-in syndrome, Tony Nicklinson, applied to the High Court for the right for a medically assisted death. His case was rejected and he decided to end his life via starvation shortly afterwards. His wife ultimately took his case to the Supreme Court, in R (Nicklinson) v Ministry of Justice, where it was rejected in 2014. The judges did rule however that they have the authority to declare the parliamentary blanket ban on assisted suicide to be incompatible with human rights law.

In 2014, the Director of Public Prosecutions further clarified the likelihood of prosecution against medical professionals. Previously, they were more likely to face assisted suicide prosecution due to their role as care givers. The DPP clarified that only those medical professionals directly involved in providing care to the concerned patient would be more likely to face prosecution. It was said that the clarification was made at the request of the Supreme Court. In 2015, the clarification was subsequently challenged in the High Court, where it was argued that the DPP was making laws as opposed to applying them. The High Court rejected the challenge against the DPP's clarifications, and the Court of Appeal subsequently denied a request to challenge the High Court's decision.

In 2017, retired lecturer Noel Conway brought his case to the High Court for the right for a medically assisted death. He has motor neurone disease and is terminally ill. His case was dismissed by the High Court, by the Court of Appeal in 2018, and ultimately by the Supreme Court at the end of 2018.

Also in 2017, a man known as "Omid T" with multiple system atrophy brought a case to the High Court for the right to a medically assisted death. His case is different from Noel Conway's in that he is not terminally ill. His case is currently in progress. In October 2018 Omid ended his life in Switzerland.

In May 2019, a man who became paralysed in a car accident and now lives with excruciating pain, Paul Lamb, began legal proceedings to seek a peaceful death. His case is supported by Humanists UK.

Opinion polls

A 2015 Populus poll found broad public support for the introduction of assisted dying laws in the United Kingdom. 82% of people supported it, including 86% of people with disabilities.

Another poll showed that 54% of British General Practitioners are either supportive or neutral towards the introduction of assisted dying laws. A similar 2017 poll on Doctors.net.uk published in the BMJ said that 55% of doctors would support it. The BMA, which represents doctors in the UK, adopted a neutral position on assisted dying in September 2021. This followed a vote in which 49% of doctors supported the change.

Assisted dying advocates
Paul Blomfield
Nigel Cox
Len Doyal
Margo MacDonald MSP (19 April 1943 – 4 April 2014)
Debbie Purdy (4 May 1963 – 23 December 2014)
Diane Pretty (15 November 1958 – 11 May 2002)
Tony Nicklinson (2 April 1954 – 20 August 2012) 
Terry Pratchett (28 April 1948 – 12 March 2015)
Patrick Stewart

Noel Conway

Noel Conway was a lecturer from Shrewsbury, England. In 2014, he was diagnosed with motor neurone disease and wanted the right to an assisted death.

All forms of assisted suicide are currently illegal in the United Kingdom, and doctors found to be assisting a suicide can be jailed for up to 14 years, under the Suicide Act 1961. Conway challenged this law in the High Court in 2017 on the grounds of human rights, claiming that the law against physician-assisted suicide in the United Kingdom interferes with his "right to respect for private and family life", protected under Article 8 of the European Convention on Human Rights. His case was supported by Dignity in Dying. On 5 October 2017 the High Court ruled against him.

Conway subsequently took his case to the Court of Appeal, which was heard in May 2018. Three judges rejected his case on 27 June 2018. The court stated that Parliament is better placed to rule on the issue and concerns were raised over whether the safeguards proposed by Conway were adequate to protect vulnerable people.

Following the decision in the Court of Appeal, Conway announced his intention to take his case to the Supreme Court. This was the first time since 2014 the Supreme Court has considered a case of assisted dying, when they reviewed the case of Tony Nicklinson posthumously. Although Nicklinson's case was ultimately rejected, some statements by the Justices were seen as positive by assisted dying campaigners. However, on 27 November 2018 the Supreme Court rejected the possibility of a full hearing for Conway's case.

Conway died on 9 June 2021 at the age of 71, after he and his family decided to remove his ventilator that kept him alive.

Organisations

The following organisations advocate legalising assisted dying or voluntary euthanasia:

 Assisted Dying Coalition, comprising
 My Death, My Decision
 Humanists UK
 Humanist Society Scotland
 Friends at the End (Charity and campaign group based in Scotland)
 End of Life Choices Jersey
 Exit (Right-to-Die Organisation)
 Dignity in Dying

See also

 Euthanasia in the United Kingdom
 All-Party Parliamentary Group for Choice at the End of Life
 Suicide legislation

References

Euthanasia in the United Kingdom
Human rights in the United Kingdom
Assisted suicide